José Alves dos Santos Neto (born 16 March 1971) is a Brazilian professional basketball coach. He is the current head coach of Petro de Luanda in the Angolan Basketball League, as well as for the Brazil women's national basketball team.

Coaching career

Pro clubs
Neto has been the head coach of the Brazilian League club Flamengo. As the head coach of Flamengo, he won the 2014 FIBA Americas League championship, and the 2014 FIBA Intercontinental Cup.

In September 2020, Neto signed as head coach of Petro de Luanda of the Angolan Basketball League and Basketball Africa League. He won the 2021 Angolan League title in his first season, and guided Petro to the third place in the 2022 BAL season.

In the 2021–22 season, Neto and Petro won the triple crown in Angola as they won all three competitions (the Angolan League, Cup and Supercup). He guided Petro to the 2022 BAL Finals where his team lost to US Monastir. On 27 May 2022, one day before the final, he was given the BAL Coach of the Year award.

National teams
Neto has also been involved with the senior men's Brazil national basketball team, which he has served as a head coach and assistant coach.

Head coaching record

|-
| style="text-align:left;"|Levanga Hokkaido
| style="text-align:left;"|2018–19
|19||4||15|||| style="text-align:center;"| Fired|||–||–||–||
| style="text-align:center;"|–
|-
| style="text-align:left;" rowspan=2 |Petro de Luanda
| style="text-align:left;"|2021
|3||3||0|||| style="text-align:center;"| 1st in Group B|||3||2||1||
| style="text-align:center;"| Third Place
|-
| style="text-align:left;"|2022
|4||4||1|||| style="text-align:center;"| 2nd in Nile Conference|||3||2||1||
| style="text-align:center;"|Lost in BAL Finals
|-

References

External links
Presentation at Brazilian Basketball Federation 
Latinbasket.com Profile
Twitter Account

1971 births
Living people
Brazilian basketball coaches
Levanga Hokkaido coaches
Sportspeople from São Paulo (state)
Club Athletico Paulistano basketball coaches
Flamengo basketball coaches
Atlético Petróleos de Luanda (basketball) coaches
Basketball Africa League coaches